Nirmalagiri College, Nirmalagiri, Kuthuparamba, established in 1964, is affiliated to Kannur University. The college was accredited with B++ grade by the NAAC and is now Re-accredited with 'A Grade' after the third cycle of accreditation. The college stood at the 93rd position in the NIRF India Rankings 2019.

Courses offered
Nirmalagiri College offers postgraduate and undergraduate courses.

Courses offered: 

 B.A. Economics
 B.A. English	
 B.A. History	
 B.A. Malayalam	
 B.Sc. Botany
 B.Sc. Chemistry
 B.Sc. Mathematics	
 B.Sc. Physics			
 B.Sc. Zoology	
 B.Sc. Home Science	
 B.Com. Finance

 M.A. Economics
 M.Sc. Chemistry
 M.Sc. Physics
 M.Sc. Zoology
The college has research centres of Kannur University in Chemistry and Physics.

Notable alumni
 Adv. Sajeev Joseph, MLA
 Sibi Thomas, Kerala Police Officer, Actor

References

External links
 

Catholic universities and colleges in India
Arts and Science colleges in Kerala
Colleges affiliated to Kannur University
Universities and colleges in Kannur district
Educational institutions established in 1964
1964 establishments in Kerala